The Japanese military aircraft designation systems for the Imperial period (pre-1945) had multiple designation systems for each armed service.  This led to the Allies' use of code names during World War II, and these code names are still better known in English-language texts than the real Japanese names for the aircraft. A number of different schemes were simultaneously in use.

Imperial Japanese Navy Air Service

The  used several different aircraft designation systems simultaneously.  Between 1931 and 1945, aircraft had Shi numbers designating the specification they were designed to.  They also had a long form of Type and Model Number system used between 1920 and 1943, a short designation system akin to that of the United States Navy in use between the late 1920s and 1945, a system of popular names introduced to replace type numbers from 1943 through 1945.

Specification Shi numbers

Japanese Navy specifications from 1931 were given an experimental, or Shi (試) number, based on the year of the Emperor's reign the specification was issued in.  Since multiple specifications could be issued in a year, the number was disambiguated with the aircraft purpose.

During the period this designation system was in use, the Emperor in question was Hirohito, the Showa Emperor, thus the years of Showa were those used, which began in 1926.

Thus, the Mitsubishi Zero was designed to meet the 1937 specification called 12-shi carrier fighter.

Long Type and Model Number system

After 1929, aircraft types were given a type number based on the last two digits of the Japanese imperial year (which is counted from the mythical founding of Japan in 660BC by Emperor Jimmu).  Added to this was a brief description of the aircraft's function.  The Mitsubishi Zero was so-called because entered service in 1940 which was the Japanese year 2600, thus it was designated Type 0 Carrier Fighter.

Model numbers were added to show subtypes.  By the late 1930s these were two digits, the first being airframe revisions, the second engine revisions.

The system was abandoned in 1943, when it was decided that it gave away too much information about the aircraft.

Short system
In the late 1920s a short designation scheme was adopted, which was similar to the 1922 United States Navy aircraft designation system.  This scheme used a letter or two letters to designate a type of aircraft, a number to indicate the Navy Design Request Number in that type of aircraft, and finally a letter to designate the manufacturer.  Unlike the US Navy system, the Japanese system did not have a different number series for each manufacturer, and did not omit the number "1".

Thus, the Zero's type in this designation system was A6M, which meant the sixth type of carrier fighter under this designation system, and that it was built by Mitsubishi.

Variants were indicated by an additional number at the end; repurposing an aircraft was indicated by a dash and then the new type letter.

Sometimes two aircraft were ordered from different manufacturers to the same specification at the same time, generally as insurance against the primary design not working out.  In this case, the same series number was used for both.
Data from:Japanese Military Aircraft Designations

Official names

After July 1943, names were given to Navy aircraft instead of type designations.  These names were given according to a scheme based on the aircraft's role. These were official names, in contrast to Army aircraft whose names were popular nicknames.

 Fighters: Weather and meteorological names
 Carrier fighters and seaplane fighters: Wind names usually ending with pu or fu (風)
 Interceptors: Lightning names ending in den (電)
 Night fighters: Light names ending in ko (光)
 Attack planes: Mountains names ending in zan (山)
 Bombers: Star  or constellation names usually ending in sei (星)
 Patrol: Sea or ocean names ending in kai (海) or yo (洋)
 Reconnaissance: Cloud names ending in un (雲)
 Trainers: Trees, plants and flowers
 Transports: Sky names ending in ku (空)
 Miscellaneous: Landscape names
 Purpose-built kamikaze aircraft: Flower names ending in ka (花)

Special cases include aircraft that employed non-conventional (i.e. non-propeller-driven) propulsion scheme like rocket-powered interceptor Shūsui (poetic term meaning "Sharp Sword") and aircraft used for non-conventional deployments such as Special Attacker Seiran ("Mountain Haze"; deployed from submarines to strike targets behind the frontline and expected to be ditched upon returning to motherships).

Imperial Japanese Army Air Service

The  (IJAAS) used a straightforward system based on year of service and type, nearly identical to the Navy's long type and model number system. This system was used from 1927, replacing an earlier system in which a  manufacturer type code from a Japanese Kanji ordinal from the Heavenly stems was assigned to the aircraft from each company, as well as a type number. With additional types being added, this system quickly became cumbersome. Assigned letters included 甲 (Ko) for Nieuport, 乙 (Otsu) for Salmson, 丙 (Hei) for SPAD, 丁 (Tei) for Farman, 戊 (Bo) for Caudron, and 己 (Ki) for Hanriot.
The "Ki" (キ; abbreviation of kitai = airframe) designation was also used and became prominent in later years.

Long Type and Model Number system
The first part of the designation was a two-digit type number based on the Japanese year in which the aircraft entered service. A minor exception was the year 1940 (2600), for which the type number 100 rather than zero was used. This was followed by a description of the aircraft's function. If there were two or more aircraft with the same type and function, the latter was enhanced to further differentiate them. An example is the Type 2 single-seat fighter (the Nakajima Ki-44) and the Type 2 two-seat fighter (Kawasaki Ki-45).

Major modifications (such as a different engine) were indicated with a subtype number, officially in kanji but often in Roman numerals. Small-scale modifications (such as armament) are indicated with a Japanese Kanji ordinal from the Heavenly stems:-  ko (甲), otsu (乙), hei (丙), tei (丁), bo (戊), ki (己), which equate to:- a (first), b (second), c (third), d (fourth), e (fifth), but are NOT direct translations. The character "kai"(改) was used if the modifications were large but not enough for a new type number.

Short designation ("Ki" number)

The "Ki" airframe designation indicates the project number (written in Arabic numerals), and was assigned in sequence to all projects regardless of manufacturer or type.

Popular names
Popular names such as "Hayabusa" (the Nakajima Ki-43) were not part of the official designation.

Calendars and Type numbers
Data from: 

Type numbers were assigned by both the Army and Navy followed the Taisho number sequence, the number of years the Emperor Taisho had been on the throne until Emperor Showa replaced him on 25 December 1926, which started the Showa sequence, at which time, the numbering was matched to the last two, or later one digit of the Imperial Japanese calendar year. The Navy began assigning Shisaku numbers to denote experimental types being evaluated by the Navy, whose numbering matched those of the Showa sequence. As no new designs were assigned Type numbers between 26 December 1926 and the end of the year, no aircraft was designated Type 86 under the Showa sequence. The Taisho/Showa sequences were used for almost all equipment developed for both Army and Navy (including weapons, equipment, vehicles and even ships), so there can be many unrelated pieces of equipment covered under a single Type number.

Designation table
This is a sortable table giving all the various designations and names of Japanese Military aircraft from circa 1925 to 1945.
Data from: and []

Imperial Japanese Navy Air Service aircraft designations

Imperial Japanese Army Air Service aircraft designations

See also 
 British military aircraft designation systems
 Japanese aircraft engine identification systems
 List of RLM aircraft designations for the Third Reich
 Mark (designation)
 Type (designation)
 World War II Allied names for Japanese aircraft

Notes

References 

 Francillon, R.J. Japanese Aircraft of the Pacific War. London:Putnam, 1970. .
 Mikesh, Robert C. and Abe, Shorzoe. Japanese Aircraft 1910–1941. London:Putnam, 1990. .

External links 
 Japanese Military Aircraft Designations (after 1945)

Japanese military aircraft
Empire of Japan
Military aircraft designation systems
Japanese designation systems